Everybody Can Suck It is the fifth stand-up comedy special by stand-up comedian Kathy Griffin on Bravo and her seventh overall.

Track listing

Personnel

Technical and production
Cori Abraham -  executive producer
Frances Berwick - executive producer
Tom Bull - supervising producer
Scott Butler - producer
Sandy Chanley - executive producer
Kathy Griffin - executive producer
Mark Hansson - line producer
Amy Introcaso - executive producer (as Amy Introcaso-Davis)
Keith Truesdell - producer
Brent Carpenter - film editor
Grady Cooper - film editor
Joshua Harman - film editor
Mark Hoffman - production design
Larry Reed - sound mixer
Rick Granville - assistant: Sandy Chanley
Mark Hansson - associate director

Visuals and imagery
Adam Christopher - hair stylist / makeup artist
Zachary Boggs - camera operator: aerial cinematography
Simon Miles - lighting designer
Joe Victoria - jib operator
Judith Brewer Curtis - wardrobe stylist (as Judith Curtis)

References

External links
Kathy Griffin's Official Website

Kathy Griffin albums
Stand-up comedy albums
2007 live albums